This is a list of scorpion species that occur in Australia:

Buthidae

 Australobuthus xerolimniorum
 Hemilychas alexandrinus
 Isometroides angusticaudus
 Isometroides vescus
 Isometrus maculatus
 Isometrus melanodactylus
 Lychas buchari
 Lychas jonesae
 Lychas marmoreus
 Lychas mjobergi
 Lychas spinatus
 Lychas variatus

Bothriuridae

 Cercophonius granulosus
 Cercophonius kershawi
 Cercophonius michaelseni
 Cercophonius queenslandae
 Cercophonius squama
 Cercophonius sulcatus

Hormuridae

 Hormurus ischnoryctes
 Hormurus karschii
 Hormurus longimanus
 Hormurus macrochela
 Hormurus ochyroscapter
 Hormurus polisorum
 Hormurus waigiensis
 Liocheles australasiae

Urodacidae

 Aops oncodactylus
 Urodacus armatus
 Urodacus butleri
 Urodacus carinatus
 Urodacus centralis
 Urodacus elongatus
 Urodacus excellens
 Urodacus giulianii
 Urodacus hartmeyeri
 Urodacus hoplurus
 Urodacus koolanensis
 Urodacus lowei
 Urodacus macrurus
 Urodacus manicatus
 Urodacus mckenziei
 Urodacus megamastigus
 Urodacus novaehollandiae
 Urodacus planimanus
 Urodacus similis
 Urodacus spinatus
 Urodacus varians
 Urodacus yaschenkoi

References

 
Lists of animals of Australia
Australia